R. Bruce King is emeritus Regents Professor at the University of Georgia.  He has contributed to many areas of organometallic chemistry, including synthesis, spectroscopy, and theory.  He is the author and editor of several monographs and book series.

Training and research interests
He received his Ph.D. in 1961 under the direction of F. Gordon A. Stone at Harvard for research on organocobalt and organoiron compounds.  He subsequently conducted studies on synthetic organometallic chemistry at DuPont and then at the Mellon Institute. His endeavors led to the first examples of diazonium complexes.  His contributions also include organophosphorus ligands.

Recognition
Among his accolades, King was recognized by the ACS Awards in Pure Chemistry (1971) and in Inorganic Chemistry (1991).

References

Living people
Inorganic chemists
21st-century American chemists
Carnegie Mellon University faculty
University of Georgia faculty
Harvard University alumni
1938 births